Prines is a local community of the municipality of Rethymno within Rethymno regional unit, Crete, Greece. Before the "Kallikratis Project" it belonged to the municipality of Nikiforos Fokas (Νικηφόρος Φωκάς).

It lies 5 km W-SW of the town of Rethymno and consists of the village Prines, with 851 inhabitants and the settlement Vederoi with 33 inhabitants (2011 census). Together, the two settlements have been classified as "preservable traditional settlements" thus retaining their traditional style and character.

Before World War II, Prines, was the capital of a commune consisting of the nearby villages Prines, Vederi and Gerani.

Prines used to be an important place during the Venetian occupation of Crete (1204-1669 AD). According to local traditions, its name derives either from a Venetian lord (that the locals used to call "Prince") who lived there or after a very common bush called "Prinos" or "Prinari" that flourishes in the area. The village church, dedicated to St. Nikolaos, dates from the 13th century.

The majority of the local products are related to agriculture (mainly olives and olive-oil) and stock-breeding but there are also some small factories which employ a number of the inhabitants.

References

Populated places in Rethymno (regional unit)